Titian may refer to:

 Titian, Venetian painter of the Italian Renaissance
 St. Titian of Brescia, 5th century bishop of Brescia
 St. Titian of Oderzo, 7th century bishop of Oderzo
 Titian, a brownish-orange tint or golden color named for the Renaissance painter
 Titian Ramsay Peale (1799–1885), American artist, naturalist, entomologist, and photographer
 Titian (crater), an impact crater on Mercury